Calgary-Glenmore, formally styled Calgary Glenmore from 1957 to 1971, is a provincial electoral district in Calgary, Alberta, Canada. The district is mandated to return a single member to the Legislative Assembly of Alberta.

The electoral riding of Calgary Glenmore is one of two original Calgary ridings of the seven that still survives from the 1959 redistribution of the Calgary riding.
This riding covers the mid-southwest portion of Calgary and contains the neighbourhoods of Bayview, Braeside, Cedarbrae, Chinook Park, Eagle Ridge, Glenmore Park, Kelvin Grove, Lakeview, Palliser, Pump Hill, Oakridge, Woodbine, and Woodlands. The riding is named after the Glenmore Reservoir.

History
The Alberta government decided to return to using the first past the post system of voting from Single Transferable Vote for the 1959 general election. The province redistributed the Calgary and Edmonton super riding's and standardized the voting system across the province.

Calgary-Glenmore was one of the six electoral districts created that year. The others were Calgary Bowness, Calgary Centre, Calgary West, Calgary North, Calgary North East, Calgary South East.

The 2010 boundary redistribution saw Calgary-Glenmore lose the neighborhood of Southwood south of Southland Drive. It gained the neighborhoods of Chinook Park, Kelvin Grove, Kingsland, North Glenmore Park and Lakeview up to Glenmore Trail.

Boundary history

Electoral history
When Calgary Glenmore was created in 1959 it covered most of Southwest Calgary that existed at the time. Voters of the district returned Progressive Conservative candidate Ernest Watkins who was the last representative elected in the old Calgary electoral district in a 1957 by-election. He became the only candidate from his party returned to the Legislature that year and one of four opposition candidates elected as most of the province had chosen Social Credit candidates that year.

Watkins became leader of the Progressive Conservatives shortly after his election. He held the leadership until 1962 when he stepped down. He decided not to run for re-election and retired from the Legislature.

The riding continued its trend of electing opposition candidates by returning Liberal candidate Bill Dickie. Dickie who had served as a Calgary Alderman was just one of two Liberals elected in the 1963 general election. He was re-elected in 1967 and crossed the floor to the Progressive Conservatives on November 23, 1969. He would be the last serving member under the Liberal banner until 1986.

The voters of Glenmore re-elected Dickie as a Progressive Conservative in the 1971 election as that party won its first term in Government under Peter Lougheed. Dickie served as the first member of cabinet for the district with the portfolio of Minister of Mines and Minerals. He retired in 1975 and was replaced by Hugh Planche who won some of the biggest majorities in his three terms representing Calgary-Glenmore. Planche served in cabinet as Minister of Economic Development from 1979 until his retirement in 1986.

The fourth member of the district Dianne Mirosh served in cabinet as Minister of Innovation and Science and later as Minister of Transportation during her time in office from 1986 to 1997. She had some tough electoral battles with Liberal candidate Brendan Dunphy as he almost managed to defeat Mirosh twice.

Ron Stevens became the districts MLA in 1997 serving until 2009. He served a number of cabinet portfolios. His first portfolio was Minister of Gaming starting in 2001. He then moved on to be the Minister of International and Intergovernmental Relations, then Attorney General and finally Deputy Premier. Stevens vacated his seat on May 15, 2009.

On September 14, 2009, the district would provide its first surprise result since the 1960s by electing Wildrose Alliance candidate Paul Hinman in a hotly contested race. Hinman was leader of his party at the time and previously served as the representative for Cardston-Taber-Warner before being defeated in 2008.

In the 2012 Alberta general election Hinman lost his seat to Progressive Conservative Linda Johnson, despite Wildrose making gains elsewhere in the province.

In 2015, Johnson and NDP candidate Anam Kazim won exactly the same number of votes in the initial count. Elections Alberta confirmed in a recount that Kazim defeated Johnson by a razor-thin margin, taking Calgary-Glenmore for the NDP.

Legislature results

1959 general election

1963 general election

1967 general election

1971 general election

1975 general election

1979 general election

1982 general election

1986 general election

1989 general election

1993 general election

1997 general election

2001 general election

2004 general election

2008 general election

2009 by-election
The 2009 by-election was initiated by the resignation of incumbent Ron Stevens on May 15, 2009. Stevens left office to accept a judicial post five days later on May 20, 2009. Premier Stelmach had six months to call the election, but he didn't wait the full-time period instead calling it for September 14, 2009.

The by-election attracted a few high-profile candidates. The only person to announce running for the Progressive Conservative nomination was Calgary Ward 13 Alderman Diane Colley-Urquhart. She was acclaimed as the candidate by the Progressive Conservative party on June 5, 2009.

The nomination for the provincial Liberal party which had previously held the riding and had finished second in every year since 1982 was hotly contested. The first candidate to announce his intention to run for the Alberta Liberal Party nomination was former Ontario NDP MPP George Dadamo. He served in the Bob Rae government from 1990 to 1995. A second candidate for the Liberal party announced on 1 June 2009, Corey Hogan a Liberal party insider. The result of Hogan running caused Dadamo to withdraw. The Liberal nominating convention took place on June 22, 2009, and resulted with 2004 and 2008 Liberal candidate Avalon Roberts winning.

The nominee for the Wildrose Alliance was former Cardston-Taber-Warner MLA and Leader of the party Paul Hinman. Hinman grew up in the community of Haysboro located in the constituency. The Wildrose Alliance nomination convention was held on June 23, 2009, with Hinman receiving the nomination by acclamation.

Candidates rounding out the field were Social Credit leader Len Skowronski who was the first candidate to be nominated and the New Democrats nominated Eric Carpendale. An Independent candidate Antoni Grochowski also filed nomination papers. He had previously run as a Social Credit candidate in Calgary-Buffalo in 2008

The election was a major test for all the political parties. The Liberals under new leader David Swann having taken the reins of the leadership in 2008 were facing their first electoral test. The Progressive Conservatives popularity was tested for the first time after winning their massive majority under Premier Ed Stelmach in the 2008 general election. The Wildrose Alliance would test their viability as a party in being able to attract enough votes in an urban riding to elect a candidate.

On election night the results showed a hotly contested race between Hinman and Roberts with Hinman coming out on top by a margin of nearly 300 votes. The result was a bitter disappointment for David Swann and the Liberals and would eventually lead him to resign as leader of the Liberal party. The Progressive Conservatives finished a distant third for the first time in the riding since 1967 and lost control of the seat they had held since 1969. The bottom three candidates barely registered with voters. The NDP result was the worst ever result in a Calgary riding since the party was formed and the Social Credit vote continued to decline falling below a percent.

2012 general election

2015 general election
The initial result of the 2015 general election was a tie between PC candidate Linda Johnson and NDP candidate Anam Kazim, each with exactly 7,015 votes. On May 15, Anam Kazim was declared the winner after a recount. On May 22, Johnson requested a judicial recount of the results. On June 3, Johnson decided she would not appeal the judicial recount, therefore she conceded and Anam Kazim was announced the winner as the judicial recount found she did indeed win with a razor thin 6 vote margin. With the judge's ruling, 3 additional votes were added each to Johnson and Kazim's vote total, however this did not change the outcome of the race.

2019 general election

Senate nominee results

2004 Senate nominee election district results

Voters had the option of selecting 4 Candidates on the Ballot

2012 Senate nominee election district results

Student Vote results

2004 election

On November 19, 2004, a student vote was conducted at participating Alberta schools to parallel the 2004 Alberta general election results. The vote was designed to educate students and simulate the electoral process for persons who have not yet reached the legal majority. The vote was conducted in 80 of the 83 provincial electoral districts with students voting for actual election candidates. Schools with a large student body that reside in another electoral district had the option to vote for candidates outside of the electoral district then where they were physically located.

References

External links
Demographics for Calgary Glenmore
Riding Map for Calgary Glenmore
Website of the Legislative Assembly of Alberta

Alberta provincial electoral districts
Politics of Calgary